The Grant County Courthouse, built in 1902, is an historic glass-and-copper-domed county courthouse building located at 126 West Main Street in Lancaster, Wisconsin. Designed by Armand D. Koch in the Classical Revival style, it was built of red sandstone.

Murals decorating the four spandrels under the dome were done by Franz E. Rohrbeck. In a small room on the 1st floor (labeled "G.A.R.") can be found "the Stars and Bars." the flag of the Confederacy, captured from Archer's troops at the Battle of Gettysburg by the 7th Wisconsin. 

On October 19, 1978, it was added to the National Register of Historic Places.

Notes

References

Courthouses on the National Register of Historic Places in Wisconsin
Neoclassical architecture in Wisconsin
Government buildings completed in 1902
Buildings and structures in Grant County, Wisconsin
County courthouses in Wisconsin
National Register of Historic Places in Grant County, Wisconsin